St. Xavier's School, Bhiwadi, is a private Catholic primary and secondary school in Bhiwadi, Rajasthan, India.
The school was founded in 1993 and is operated by the Jesuits of Delhi Province of the Society of Jesus, an international Catholic religious order, and the Franciscan Sisters of Our Lady of Graces. 

The school is affiliated to the Central Board of Secondary Education (CBSE) for the All India Secondary School Examination (Class X) and All India Senior School Certificate Examination (Class XII).

See also
 List of Jesuit schools

References

External links

Jesuit primary schools in India
Christian schools in Rajasthan
High schools and secondary schools in Rajasthan
Education in Alwar district
Bhiwadi
Educational institutions established in 1993
1993 establishments in Rajasthan
Jesuit secondary schools in India